Joseph George Harris Wright Jr. (March 28, 1906 – June 7, 1981) was a Canadian rower who competed in the 1928 Summer Olympics and in the 1932 Summer Olympics. He was inducted into Canada's Sports Hall of Fame in 1955. Joe Wright Jr,. and his father, Joe Wright Sr., are among the most decorated and celebrated members of the Argonaut Rowing Club all time.

In 1928 he became Canadian (CAAO) and US (NAAO) single sculls champion and only the second Canadian to win the coveted Diamond Challenge Sculls at the Annual Henley Royal Regatta. He won the Olympic silver medal with his partner Jack Guest in the double sculls competition. He also competed in the single sculls event and finished fifth after being eliminated in the quarter-finals.

Four years later he was the only rower who did not reach the final in the single sculls competition. His athletic career included playing football for the Toronto Argonauts football club (founded in 1873 by the Argonaut Rowing Club), he played center (snap) from 1924 to 1936 and won the Grey Cup in 1933.

He was coached by his father Joseph Wright Sr., who won a silver medal at the 1904 Summer Olympics as a member of a Canadian eights crew.

References

 
 Canada's Sports Hall of Fame Entry

1906 births
1981 deaths
Canadian male rowers
Olympic rowers of Canada
Olympic silver medalists for Canada
Medalists at the 1928 Summer Olympics
Rowers at the 1928 Summer Olympics
Rowers at the 1932 Summer Olympics
Olympic medalists in rowing
Rowers from Toronto